Miss Arab World is an annual regional beauty pageant in the Arab World. The contest seeks to select the Arab girl that best represents her country based on traditional Arab customs and traditions.

Titleholders

Titleholders by country

Runners-up

See also
 List of beauty pageants

References

External links
 

Recurring events established in 2006
International beauty pageants
Continental beauty pageants